Calcium tartrate, exactly calcium L-tartrate, is a byproduct of the wine industry, prepared from wine fermentation dregs. It is the calcium salt of  L-tartaric acid, an acid most commonly found in grapes. Its solubility decreases with lower temperature, which results in the forming of whitish (in red wine often reddish) crystalline  clusters as it precipitates. As E number E354, it finds use as a food preservative and acidity regulator. Like tartaric acid, calcium tartrate has two asymmetric carbons, hence it has two chiral isomers and a non-chiral isomer (meso-form). Most calcium tartrate of biological origin is the chiral levorotatory (–) isomer.

References

Calcium compounds
Tartrates
Preservatives
E-number additives